Adam Highfield (born 1 March 1981) is a New Zealand football goalkeeper who currently plays for Ferrymead Bays in the Mainland Premier League. He has previously played for Canterbury United and Otago United in the New Zealand Football Championship and for FC Jokerit and Atlantis FC in Finland.

Early life
Highfield was born in Christchurch before moving to Wales as a two-year-old, returning to New Zealand at the age of 10.

Club career
Highfield played for Finnish side FC Jokerit, and later for Atlantis FC before returning to New Zealand in 2006 on loan to  Canterbury United of the New Zealand Football Championship. He returned to Atlantis for the 2007 season.

In 2015, Highfield played his 100th match in the New Zealand Football Championship.

International career
Highfield represented New Zealand at under 20 level.

In the lead-up to New Zealand's opening Olympic qualifier in 2004, Highfield fractured his wrist, ruling him out of the All Whites' qualifying campaign.

In 2002, Highfield was called up for a New Zealand tour of Poland and Estonia, though he did not make an onfield appearance.

References

External links

Player Profile

1981 births
People educated at St Thomas of Canterbury College
Living people
Canterbury United players
New Zealand association footballers
Association football goalkeepers
FC Jokerit players
Atlantis FC players